Cyperus plukenetii is a species of sedge that is native to south central and south eastern parts of United States.

See also 
 List of Cyperus species

References 

plukenetii
Plants described in 1945
Flora of Alabama
Flora of Arkansas
Flora of Delaware
Flora of Florida
Flora of Georgia (U.S. state)
Flora of Kentucky
Flora of Louisiana
Flora of Maryland
Flora of Mississippi
Flora of Missouri
Flora of New Jersey
Flora of North Carolina
Flora of South Carolina
Flora of Oklahoma
Flora of Tennessee
Flora of Texas
Flora of Virginia
Taxa named by Merritt Lyndon Fernald
Flora without expected TNC conservation status